Martin Richards QPM (born 1959) is a British retired police officer, whose last post was as the Chief Constable of Sussex Police, a position in which he served from 1 October 2008 until his retirement from the Police service in 2014. He previously served as Chief Constable of the Wiltshire Police.

Education
Richards was a student at Warwick School located in Warwick, England, from 1966 to 1977. For his tertiary education, he attended and graduated from Bristol University located in Bristol, England. Richards later attained a Masters in Criminology at Cambridge University following his entrance into the police force.

Career

Richards joined Warwickshire Police in 1982, where he was stationed across a range of geographical areas in numerous roles. His command positions included District Commander at Nuneaton, Head of Communications, Performance Review Manager, and a short period as Head of CID. He also served for two years in National Police Training as Head of Recruit Training Center at Ryton-on-Dunsmore.

After obtaining his Criminology degree, Richards was promoted to Assistant Chief Constable at Avon and Somerset Constabulary in 1998. He was promoted to Deputy Chief Constable in 2002.

Richards was appointed Chief Constable of the Wiltshire Police in September 2004. While he was Chief Constable, he oversaw "Optimus", a 12-month program of modernisation and reform within the Force, as well as a collaborative project involving all five Forces within the South West region.

Richards was the Chair of the National Training Managers Group. When the minimum national qualification was introduced in January 2010 by the NPIA (National Policing Improvement Agency), he oversaw the national implementation of Initial Police Learning and Development Programme (IPLDP), a compulsory diploma to be obtained by all new recruits. Richards also represented Association of Chief Police Officers on the Police Dependants' Trust.
Richards is now the Independent Chair of Chichester Diocese Safeguarding Panel. Also he is a Non Executive director with Sussex NHS partnership Mental Health.

Personal life
Richards has two sons from his first marriage, Charlie and Hugh and two stepsons, Robert and Marcus.

Honours

References
 

1959 births
Living people
British Chief Constables
English recipients of the Queen's Police Medal
People educated at Warwick School